KF Delvina is an Albanian football club based in the southern city of Delvinë. They are currently competing in the Kategoria e Dytë, which is the third level of football in the country. The club's home ground is Panajot Pano Stadium, with a capacity of 2,500. In the 2011-12 season, the club finished in 8th place. In the 2015-16 season, the club finished in 3rd place, qualifying for the 2016-17 Albanian Cup but did not compete due to a suspension. They won the 1986-87 Albanian Second Division trophy. The club's kit manufacturer is Givova and the main sponsor is Santa Quaranta, a resort in Sarandë.

External links
 Soccerway

Delvina
Delvinë
Association football clubs established in 1918
Albanian Third Division clubs
Kategoria e Dytë clubs